Andrea Dotti may refer to:

 Andrea Dotti (psychiatrist) (1938–2007), Italian psychiatrist, second husband of Audrey Hepburn
 Andrea Dotti (saint) (1256–1315), Italian Servite preacher